Wicus Blaauw (born 8 April 1986) is a South African rugby union footballer.

He previously represented Edinburgh in the Pro12, Biarritz in the French Top 14 Championship, the Stormers in Super Rugby and Western Province in the Currie Cup and Vodacom Cup.

External links 
Stormers profile
WP rugby profile

itsrugby.co.uk profile

1986 births
Living people
Afrikaner people
Biarritz Olympique players
Leopards (rugby union) players
Namibian expatriate sportspeople in South Africa
Rugby union players from Windhoek
Rugby union props
South African rugby union players
Stormers players
Western Province (rugby union) players
White Namibian people